A Girl Like Her may refer to:

 A Girl Like Her (2012 film), an American documentary film by Ann Fessler 
 A Girl Like Her (2015 film), an American drama film directed by Amy S. Weber